John McGovern (7 March 1932 – 24 February 2022) was an Irish hurler who played at club level with Bennettsbridge and at inter-county level with the Kilkenny senior hurling team. He usually lined out as a wing-back.

Playing career
McGovern first came to prominence as a hurler at club level with Bennettsbridge. In a career that spanned 21 years, he won a record eleven Kilkenny SHC titles. McGovern first appeared on the inter-county scene during a two-year stint with the Kilkenny minor hurling team and ended his time in that grade with a defeat of Tipperary in the 1950 All-Ireland minor final. McGovern subsequently earned inclusion on the Kilkenny senior hurling team and served as team captain in his debut season in 1953. His senior career brought All-Ireland triumphs over Waterford in 1957 and 1963. McGovern's other inter-county honours included six Leinster Championships and a National League title. He won a Railway Cup medal as captain of Leinster in 1954.

Management career
In retirement from inter-county hurling, McGovern joined the selection committee of the Kilkenny senior hurling team in 1967. His eleven-year association with the team yielded five All-Ireland Championships, numerous Leinster Championships and a National League title.

Personal life and death
McGovern was born in Bennettsbridge, County Kilkenny in March 1932. He began his working life with Bennettsbridge Creamery before later working with Esso. McGovern died in Bennettsbridge on 24 February 2022, at the age of 89.

Honours

Player

Bennettsbridge
Kilkenny Senior Hurling Championship: 1952, 1953, 1955, 1956, 1959, 1960, 1962, 1964, 1966, 1967, 1971

Kilkenny
All-Ireland Senior Hurling Championship: 1957, 1963
Leinster Senior Hurling Championship: 1953 (c), 1957, 1958, 1959, 1963, 1964
National Hurling League: 1961–62
All-Ireland Minor Hurling Championship: 1950
Leinster Minor Hurling Championship: 1949, 1950

Leinster
Railway Cup: 1954 (c)

Selector

Kilkenny
All-Ireland Senior Hurling Championship: 1967, 1969, 1972, 1974, 1975
Leinster Senior Hurling Championship: 1967, 1969, 1971, 1972, 1973, 1974, 1975, 1978
National Hurling League: 1975–76

References

1932 births
2022 deaths
Bennettsbridge hurlers
Kilkenny inter-county hurlers
Leinster inter-provincial hurlers
Hurling selectors
All-Ireland Senior Hurling Championship winners